The Revista Cubana de Medicina Tropical is a Cuban medical journal concerning tropical medicine. The journal was first published in 1945 and is published in Spanish, although abstracts are available in English. Electronic versions in PDF format are available of articles published after 1995 online. The journal is abstracted and indexed in Excerpta Medica, Biological Abstracts, Index Medicus,                and SciELO.

External links

 

Tropical medicine and hygiene journals
Publications established in 1945